Rangeroceratidae is a family of orthoceroid cephalopods known from the late Early Ordovician in eastern North America (New York and Quebec) and Great Britain, included in the order Dissidocerida. The family was named by Evans, 2005, and contains three genera: Rangeroceras, Anrangeroceras, and Cyclorageroceras.

Rangeroceratidae is based on the genus Rangeroceras, named by Hook & Flower (1977); at that time considered a member of the rod-bearing Baltoceratidae along with genera like Rhabdiferoceras and Veneficoceras.

References
 Paleobiology Database Rangeroceratidae
 D. H. Evans. 2005. The Lower and Middle Ordovician cephalopod faunas of England and Wales. Monograph of the Palaeontographical Society 623:1-81
 Stephen C. Hook and Rousseau H Flower, 1977. Late Canadian (Zones J,K) Cephalopod Faunas from Southwestern United States. New Mexico Bureau of Mines & Mineral Resources Memoir 32.

Orthocerida
Prehistoric cephalopod families
Early Ordovician first appearances
Early Ordovician extinctions